Bert Jackson may refer to:

Bert Jackson (baseball) (Bozo Jackson), American baseball player of the 1930s and 1940s
Bertram Jackson (1882–1940), English footballer
Bert Jackson, candidate in Meadow Lake (electoral district)
Bert Jackson, character in Blackout played by Alex Paez
Bert Jackson, character in Take Me High
Bert Jackson, character in Below the Sea, played by Paul Page (actor)

See also
Albert Jackson (disambiguation)
Robert Jackson (disambiguation)
Herbert Jackson (disambiguation)
Hubert Jackson, boxer, opponent of Marlon Starling